101 Avenue is the alignment of three roadways in Edmonton separated by the North Saskatchewan River valley:

Stony Plain Road west of downtown
Jasper Avenue through downtown
97/98/101 Avenue east of the North Saskatchewan River (becomes Baseline Road)

Roads in Edmonton